Emmanuel Thomas Lumeri (born 16 May 1993) is a South Sudanese footballer who plays as a midfielder for South Sudan Premier League club Amarat United and the South Sudan national team.

Club career
Lumeri has played for Amarat United in South Sudan.

International career
Lumeri capped for South Sudan at senior level during the 2022 FIFA World Cup qualification (CAF First Round).

References

External links

1993 births
Living people
People from Juba
South Sudanese footballers
Association football midfielders
South Sudan international footballers